Vipra Narayana is a 1954 Telugu-language biographical film directed, produced and edited by P. S. Ramakrishna Rao under Bharani Studios banner. It stars Akkineni Nageswara Rao, Bhanumathi, and Relangi with music composed by S. Rajeswara Rao. The film is based on the life of Tamil Vaishnava saint Vipranarayana. He led his life in devotion to Lord Narayana and worked for the Lord by dedicating him with garlands. He is one of the twelve Alvars. The film is also dubbed in Tamil with the same title and released in 1955.

Plot
Vipra Narayana, a staunch devotee of Vishnu, lives in a hermitage on the banks of the river Kaveri along with his disciple Rangaraju. He worships Vishnu in the form of Ranganatha, the presiding deity of the nearby Srirangam temple. Every day, Narayana makes garlands out of flowers from his garden and offers them to Ranganatha and sings hymns in praise of him.

One day, Devadevi, a devadasi, performs a dance recital at the court of the Chola King and is on her way back to home along with her sister Madhuravani. When Devadevi passes through the hermitage, Narayana does not notice her; this hurts Devadevi's vanity. She mistakes his devotion towards Ranganatha as arrogance and decides to teach him a lesson, ignoring Madhuravani's advice.

Devadevi enters Narayana's hermitage as an orphan and narrates her woes, requesting for a stay to support herself. Narayana agrees despite Rangaraju's objection and Devadevi becomes the former's disciple. In a turn of events, Rangaraju is expelled from the hermitage when he tries to send Devadevi away after realising her intentions. As time passes, Narayana finds himself attracted to Devadevi and falls for her charms.

Once her ego is satisfied, Devadevi begins to regret her act. Madhuravani asks her to return and Narayana follows them. Devadevi's mother Rangasani, upon knowing that Narayana is penniless, throws him away. To help Narayana win, Ranganatha visits Devadevi's house in the disguise of Rangaraju. He presents a golden vessel from the kitchen of Srirangam temple as a gift from Narayana to Devadevi.

The next day, the priests at the temple complain that the golden vessel is missing and find it at Devadevi's house. Narayana is accused of stealing the vessel and is produced in the court. The King orders that Narayana's hands be amputated as a punishment for theft. Ranganatha appears at the scene and reveals the truth. Ranganatha adds that Narayana is an incarnation of Vyjayanthi, a garland that adorns him at his heavenly abode Vaikuntha and that Devadevi is a gandharva who took a human birth due to a curse. Narayana and Devadevi visit Srirangam temple and sing praises of the deity, before attaining salvation.

Cast
Akkineni Nageswara Rao as Vipranarayana
Bhanumathi as Devadevi
Relangi as Rangaraju
Rushyendramani as Mother of Devadevi
V. Sivaram as Maharaja
Allu Ramalingaiah
Sandhya as Madhuravani

Soundtrack

Music was composed by S. Rajeswara Rao. Lyrics were written by Samudrala Sr.

Legend
The story revolves around a Brahmin who makes flower garlands. He devotes his life to Lord. He is seduced by a woman who is determined to make him break his vow.

1937 film
Vipra Narayana was made in Telugu language for the first time in 1937 by Aurora Pictures. It stars Kasturi Narasimha Rao, Kanchanamala and Tanguturi Suryakumari, and was directed by Ahindra Chaudhari.

It was made in Tamil too with Rajamadam G. Sundara Bhagavathar featuring as Vipra Narayana. The film was produced by Sri Gopalakrishna Films at Madras Sound Studios and was directed by K. Ranga Rao. T. Suryakumari featured as Andal in the film.

1938 film
Vipra Narayana was made in the Tamil language again in 1938 by Srinivas Cinetone. It stars Kothamangalam Cheenu and T. V. Rajasundari, the film was produced and directed by A. Narayanan. Meena Narayanan did the audiography.

1954 film
Vipra Narayana was made in both Telugu and Tamil, directed and produced by P. S. Ramakrishna Rao and P. Bhanumathi of Bharani Pictures. The title role was played by A. Nageswara Rao. S. D. Sundharam wrote the dialogues and lyrics for the Tamil version.

Awards
 The film won National Film Award for Best Feature Film in Telugu - Certificate of merit in 1954 at 2nd National Film Awards

Notes

References

External links
 

1954 films
Indian biographical films
Best Telugu Feature Film National Film Award winners
1950s Telugu-language films
1950s Tamil-language films
Films directed by P. S. Ramakrishna Rao
1950s biographical films
Indian black-and-white films